The Enranger 737 is a seven-seater compact MPV in a configuration of 2-2-3 produced by Weichai Auto.

Overview

Formerly known as the Yingzhi M301 during development phase, the Enranger 737 for China debuted during the 2015 Chengdu Auto Show in September 2015, and was launched on the Chinese car market in September 2015.

The name of the Enranger 737 was inspired by the Boeing 737 passenger jet, with pictures of the Boeing 737 displayed on a backdrop in the Weichai Auto factory (though the backdrop was actually displays of the 787 Dreamliner with "737" logo on the tail) during the launching ceremony of the Enranger 737 production line.

Price of the Enranger 737 starts from 56,800 yuan and ends at 99,800 yuan. The versions dubbed the Yingzhi 737 Internet Edition that features a 16-inch touch screen in the interior starts at 77,800 yuan. As of 2019, prices of the Enranger 737 were lowered to 49,800 yuan to 87,800 yuan.

Engines
There are two four-cylinder petrol engines options available for the Enranger 737, including a 1.5 liter producing  and a 1.5 liter turbo producing , both engines mated to a five-speed manual gearbox or a CVT.

Enranger 737 EV
The Enranger 737 EV is the electric version of the Enranger 737 with only minor parts such as the grilles and front bumpers being redesigned. The Enranger 737 EV has an energy consumption of 17 kWh/100 km. Charging for the Enranger 737 EV takes one hour for an 80 percent charge via a fast charger and 13 hours for a slow full charge.

The price of the Enranger 737 EV is 146,800 yuan.

Enranger 727
The Enranger 727 is the lower trim of the Enranger 737. Built on exactly the same structure, the Enranger 727 was sold with less options and as a commercial minivan. The Enranger 727 was therefore cheaper with the price of the Enranger 737 starting from 46,800 yuan and ending at 49,800 yuan.

Enranger G5
The Enranger G5 concept or Yingzhi G5 concept debuted on the 2015 Chengdu Auto show in September 2015, and the production version was launched in China in late 2015. Despite being called the Enranger G5, the production version of the Enranger G5 has little in common with the Enranger G5 concept shown during the 2015 Chengdu Auto show, as it is essentially the crossover version of the Enranger 737 compact MPV. Price of the Enranger G5 starts from 59,800 yuan and ends at 85,800 yuan.

References

External links

Enranger 737 official site
Enranger 727 official site
Enranger G5 official site

Minivans
Cars introduced in 2015
Front-wheel-drive vehicles
2010s cars
Cars of China
Production electric cars